Sekolah Menengah Kebangsaan Bagan Jaya (abbreviated SMKBJ or BJHS) is a secondary school in Butterworth,  Malaysia. Previous name as Sekolah Menengah Kebangsaan Kampung Simpah

References 

Secondary schools in Malaysia
Educational institutions established in 1998
1998 establishments in Malaysia
Publicly funded schools in Malaysia